S.S. Lazio finished in 15th place, relegated from Serie A.

Squad

Goalkeepers
  Fernando Orsi
  Massimo Cacciatori
  Nello Cusin

Defenders
  Enrico Calisti
  Daniele Filisetti
  Lionello Manfredonia
  Renato Miele
  Gabriele Podavini
  Arcadio Spinozzi
  Massimo Storgato
  Arturo Vianello

Midfielders
  Batista
  Vincenzo D'Amico
  Francesco Fonte
  Giancarlo Marini
  Fortunato Torrisi
  Claudio Vinazzani
  Michael Laudrup

Attackers
  Bruno Giordano
  Oliviero Garlini
  Francesco Dell'Anno
  Alessandro Toti

Competitions

Serie A

League table

Matches

Coppa Italia

Group 3

Genoa qualified to Eightfinals due to better Goal Difference.

References

External links
RSSSF - Italy 1984/85

S.S. Lazio seasons
Lazio